Straw Hat is a 1971 Czechoslovak comedy film written by Miloš Macourek and Oldřich Lipský, and directed by Lipský as well. It stars Miloš Kopecký in the leading role. The film is based on the 1851 play The Italian Straw Hat by Eugène Labiche and Marc-Michel.

Summary
Fadinard is on the way to his wedding, when his horse picks up and eats a straw hat. The owner of the hat is a married woman who, at the time, is in the embrace of a French officer, Lieutenant Tavernier. The officer follows Fadinard to his home and demands that he replace the hat, so that his mistress can return home to her husband without arousing suspicion. Fearing that Tavernier will wreck his new apartment, Fadinard hastens to his wedding, using every opportunity he can to find a replacement hat. When he finally manages to find one, things become even more complicated.

Cast and characters
 Miloš Kopecký as Maurice Fadinard
 Iva Janžurová as Helenka, Fadinard's fiancée
 Vladimír Menšík as Bernard Nonancourt, greengrocer
 Stella Zázvorková as Aunt Klotylda
 Lubomír Kostelka as Uncle Charles
 Květa Fialová as Anais Beauperthuis
 Pavel Landovský as Officer Emil
 Jirí Hrzán as Cousin Bobin
 Ilja Prachař as Albert Beauperthuis
 Josef Kemr as Servant Felix

References

External links
 

1971 films
1970s Czech-language films
Czechoslovak comedy films
Films directed by Oldřich Lipský
Czech comedy films